Cathal Vaughan (born 10 January 1994) is an Irish Gaelic footballer who plays for club side Iveleary. He has also lined out with divisional side Muskerry and at inter-county level with the Cork senior football team. He usually lines out in the forwards.

Honours

Iveleary
Mid Cork Junior A Football Championship: 2015, 2018, 2019, 2020

Cork
McGrath Cup: 2018
All-Ireland Junior Football Championship: 2013
Munster Junior Football Championship: 2013
Munster Under-21 Football Championship: 2013, 2014

References

1994 births
Living people
CIT Gaelic footballers
Iveleary Gaelic footballers
Muskerry Gaelic footballers
Cork inter-county Gaelic footballers